The first inscriptions on the UNESCO Memory of the World International Register were made in 1997. By creating a compendium of the world’s documentary heritage—manuscripts, oral traditions, audio-visual materials, library and archive holdings – the program aims to tap on its networks of experts to exchange information and raise resources for the preservation, digitization, and dissemination of documentary materials. As of 2018, 432 documentary heritages have been included in the Register, among them recordings of folk music, ancient languages and phonetics, aged remnants of religious and secular manuscripts, collective lifetime works of renowned giants of literature, science and music, copies of landmark motion pictures and short films, and accounts documenting changes in the world’s political, economic and social stage. Of these, seven properties were nominated by international organizations.

List by international organization

Notes

References

External links
 UNESCO Memory of the World Programme official website
 Memory of the World Register – International Organizations